Another Voice is the eighth full-length studio album from New York hardcore band Agnostic Front. It was released in November 2004 on Nuclear Blast Records (January 2005 in the US) and follows 2002's split album with Discipline, Working Class Heroes. It was the first recording on the label and was co-produced by Jamey Jasta of the band Hatebreed. It features many guest vocal spots. 2006 saw the release of another live album, Live at CBGB – 25 Years of Blood, Honor and Truth.

This album marks the comeback to the crossover thrash sound, that they played in the 1980s.

Track listing
All tracks written by Agnostic Front.

Personnel
Agnostic Front
 Roger Miret – vocals
 Vinnie Stigma – lead guitar
 Matt Henderson – rhythm guitar
 Mike Gallo – bass
 Steve Gallo – drums
Production
 Billy Siegel – additional guitars
 Karl Buechner (Earth Crisis, Freya) – backing vocals
 Armand Crump – backing vocals
 Brian Darwas – backing vocals
 Lenny DiSclafani – backing vocals
 Josh Grden – backing vocals
 Joe Harrington – backing vocals
 Henry Hurteau – backing vocals
 Ian Larrabee – backing vocals
 Ivan Murillo – backing vocals
 Matt Pike – backing vocals
 John O'Grady – backing vocals
 Jamey Jasta (Hatebreed) – backing vocals
 Paul Romanko (Shadows Fall) – backing vocals
 Brian Schmidt – backing vocals
 Scott Vogel (Terror) – backing vocals
 Produced by Zeuss and Jamey Jasta 
 Engineered by Zeuss and Dean Baltulonis
 Mastered by Alan Douches

References

External links
Nuclear Blast Records album page
Agnostic Front official website

2005 albums
Agnostic Front albums
Albums produced by Chris "Zeuss" Harris